Syncios (or Syncios Mobile Manager) is a mobile device management and mobile data transfer software developed by Anvsoft Inc. It is also a media player, online video downloader, handset ringtone maker.  It is used to play, download, and organize digital audio and video; transfer data between mobile phones, tablets and personal computers running the OS X or Microsoft Windows operating systems. The program is available for iOS management (iPhone, iPad, and iPod Touch) and Android devices management. Latest Android OS is supported. Ios16.0 and 16.0.2 are NOT supported. Furthermore this application's installation components do not register with Windows App Wizard, thereby evading the ease of uninstallation by the lay user.

Main features

Data backup and restore

The Syncios Software currently supports backing up and transferring mobile phone files selectively or in batch, including music, video, photos, apps, notes, bookmarks, contacts, text messages, iMessages, call logs, Safari history and WhatsApp messages.

It also supports transferring music, pictures, videos, sms, mms, apps, contacts, call history, bookmarks or more between iOS / Android devices and computer. Restoring data from iTunes or iCloud backup to iOS/Android phone is also available.

Online video downloading
Syncios also acts as an online video downloader. It supports downloading videos from 100+ online video sharing sites and 4K UHD video, including YouTube, Facebook, Dailymotion, Vimeo, Metacafe, Howcast, Niconico and more. Users are allowed to convert and import downloaded videos and audio files on to their mobile devices directly.

Audio/video converter
Syncios supports to convert audio files to MP3/M4A/M4R/CAF format, convert videos to MP4/M4V/MOV format and directly transfer converted files to your phone. It also works as a Ringtone maker which allows you to make custom ringtone or text tone.

Edit device contents
The last category on Syncios called "Information" loads contacts, notes, bookmarks, call history, messages, safari history, voicemail and WhatsApp from the iOS device. Users can edit contact data in regard to the first and last name, company, department, postal code, birthday, phone number, locate and delete duplicates, back up information to the computer for safekeeping, delete contacts and notes and create new ones, as well as transfer bookmarks, call history and messages.

History
The first version of Syncios was developed and released by Anvsoft Inc on July 11, 2012. At the beginning, it was created as an iTunes alternative tool. The early version is only available on Windows computer, including Windows, XP, Windows 7, Windows 8 and supports only iOS devices.

The Syncios Mac version was released on August 25, 2015 for free, but the functions are not as powerful as the Windows version. Features like Video Downloader, Ringtone Maker and iTunes library Manager were hidden.

Change history for Syncios Manager for win:

12/21/2015, Syncios Manager for win 5.0.0 was released, which was a milestone. It began to support and manage Android phones and tablets.
11/2/2016, Syncios Manager for win 6.0.0 was released, which adds all data transfer features and allows free users to upgrade to paid Ultimate version. 
7/14/2017, Syncios Manager for win 6.2.0 was released, which fully compatible with the latest iOS 11 beta and Android 7.0 Nougat.
9/1/2018, Syncios Manager for win 6.5.1 was released, which fully compatible with iOS 12.
7/29/2019, Syncios Manager for win 6.6.2 was released, which fully compatible with iOS 13.
11/1/2019, Syncios Manager for win 6.6.4 was released, which fully compatible with Android 10.
7/8/2020, Syncios Manager for win 6.6.9 was released, which fully compatible with iOS 14.

Change history for Syncios Manager for mac:

11/5/2019,  Syncios Manager for mac 7.0.0 was released, which fully compatible with iOS 13, Mac OS 10.15, and this version began to support and manage Android phones and tablets including latest Android 10 devices.
8/7/2020,  Syncios Manager for mac 7.0.2 was released, which fully compatible with iOS 14.

System requirements
The following is for the newest version of Syncios.

Windows
 Operating System: Window 8.1/ 8/ 7/ 10/ Vista (32&64bits) 
 CPU: 750 MHz Intel or AMD CPU
 RAM: 256 MB or above.
 Disk Space: 200 MB or more

Mac
 Operating System: Mac OS X 10.9, 10.10, 10.11, 10.12, 10.13, 10.14, 10.15.
 CPU: Intel Core 1 GHz or faster
 Hard Disk Space: 1G and above

Reception
Liane Cassavoy of PC World rated it 4/5 stars and called it a better choice than iTunes for Apple iOS devices.

References

External links
 Syncios Official Website
 Syncios Facebook Page
 Syncios Twitter Page
 Syncios YouTube Channel

Windows software
MacOS software